Benjamin Angus Wright is an English award-winning media composer based in London, England. He has composed for the BBC, Discovery, Destination Films and many other major clients.  In 2009 he won 'Best Music' at the prestigious Missoula International Wildlife Film Festival for his score to Mike Birkhead's Amba, the Russian Tiger.  His company is called 'Compose to Picture'.  Before working in television and film, Wright wrote for the band "Obaben" (Human Condition Records) and "Delay 68" to critical acclaim in the Scottish press.

References

External links 
Thomas and the Magic Railroad at IMDB
Review of Thomas and the Magic Railroad Soundtrack
Homepage for Ben Angus Wright
Delay 88

Living people
Year of birth missing (living people)
Musicians from London
English television composers
English male composers
Composers
British composers